Tuxcueca is a town and municipality, in Jalisco in central-western Mexico. The municipality covers an area of 298.94 km².

As of 2018, the municipality had a total population of 5765. It is a very small village located on the coast of El Lago de Chapala.

References

Municipalities of Jalisco